Mary Henrietta Kingsley (13 October 1862 – 3 June 1900) was an English ethnographer, scientific writer, and explorer whose travels throughout West Africa and resulting work helped shape European perceptions of both African cultures and British colonialism in Africa.

Early life 
Kingsley was born in London on 13 October 1862, the daughter and oldest child of physician, traveller and writer George Kingsley and Mary Bailey. She came from a family of writers, as she was also the niece of novelists Charles Kingsley and Henry Kingsley. The family moved to Highgate less than a year after her birth, the same home where her brother Charles George R. ("Charley") Kingsley was born in 1866, and by 1881 were living in Southwood House, Bexley in Kent.

Her father was a physician and worked for George Herbert, 13th Earl of Pembroke, and other aristocrats and was frequently away from home on his excursions. During these voyages he collected information for his studies. Dr. Kingsley accompanied Lord Dunraven on a trip to North America in 1870– 1875. During this trip, Dr. Kingsley was invited to accompany George Armstrong Custer's U.S. Army expedition against the Sioux Indians. The reported massacre of Custer's force terrified the Kingsley family, but they were relieved to learn that bad weather had kept Dr. Kingsley from joining Custer. It is possible that her father's views on the treatment faced by Native Americans during the helped shape Mary's later opinions on British colonialism in West Africa.

In terms of Kingsley's education, she had little formal schooling compared to her brother, other than German lessons at a young age; because, at that time, and at her level of society, education was not thought to be necessary for a girl. She did, however, have access to her father's large library and loved to hear her father's stories of foreign countries. She did not enjoy novels that were deemed more appropriate for young ladies of the time, such as those by Jane Austen or Charlotte Brontë, but preferred books on the sciences and memoirs of explorers. In 1886, her brother Charley entered Christ's College, Cambridge, to read law; this allowed Mary to make several academic connections and a few friends.

With respect to religion, there is little indication that Kingsley was raised Christian; instead, she was a self-proclaimed believer with, "summed up in her own words [...] 'an utter faith in God'" and even identified strongly with what was described as 'the African religion'. She is known for criticizing Christian missionaries and their work for supplanting pre-existing African cultures without proving any real benefits in return.

The 1891 England census finds Mary's mother and her two children living at 7 Mortimer Road, Cambridge, where Charles is recorded as a BA Student at Law and Mary as a Student of Medicine. In her later years, Kingsley's mother became ill, and she was expected to care for her well-being. Unable to leave her mother's side, she was limited in her travel opportunities. Soon, her father was also bedridden with rheumatic fever following an excursion. 

Dr. Kingsley died in February 1892, and Mrs. Kingsley followed a few months later in April of the same year. "Freed" from her family responsibilities and with an inheritance of £8,600 to be split evenly with her brother, Kingsley was now able to travel as she had always dreamed.

Adventures to Africa 

After a preliminary visit to the Canary Islands, Kingsley decided to travel to the west coast of Africa. Generally, the only non-African women who embarked on (often dangerous) journeys to Africa were the wives of missionaries, government officials, or explorers. Exploration and adventure had not been seen as fitting roles for English women, though this was changing under the influence of figures such as Isabella Bird and Marianne North. African women were surprised that a woman of Kingsley's age was travelling without a man, as she was frequently asked why her husband was not accompanying her.

Kingsley landed in Sierra Leone on 17 August 1893 and from there travelled further to Luanda in Angola. She lived with local people, who taught her necessary surviving-skills for living in the wilderness, and gave her advice. She often went into dangerous areas alone. Her training as a nurse at the :de:Kaiserswerther Diakonie had prepared her for slight injuries and jungle maladies that she would later encounter. Kingsley returned to England in December 1893.

Upon her return, Kingsley secured support and aid from Dr. Albert Günther, a prominent zoologist at the British Museum, as well as a writing agreement with publisher George Macmillan, for she wished to publish her travel accounts.

She returned to Africa yet again on 23 December 1894 with more support and supplies from England, as well as increased self-assurance in her work. She longed to study "cannibal" people and their traditional religious practices, commonly referred to as "fetish" during the Victorian Era. In April, she became acquainted with Scottish missionary Mary Slessor, another European woman living among native African populations with little company and no husband. It was during her meeting with Slessor that Kingsley first became aware of the custom of twin killing, a custom which Slessor was determined to stop. The native people believed that one of the twins was the offspring of the devil who had secretly mated with the mother and since the innocent child was impossible to distinguish, both were killed and the mother was often killed as well for attracting the devil to impregnate her. Kingsley arrived at Slessor's residence shortly after she had taken in a recent mother of twins and her surviving child.

Later in Gabon, Kingsley canoed up the Ogooué River, where she collected specimens of fish previously unknown to western science, three of which were later named after her. After meeting the Fang people and travelling through uncharted Fang territory, she daringly climbed the  Mount Cameroon by a route not previously attempted by any other European. She moored her boat at Donguila.

Return to England
When she returned home in November 1895, Kingsley was greeted by journalists eager to interview her. The reports that were drummed up about her voyage, however, were most upsetting, as the papers portrayed her as a "New Woman", an image which she did not embrace. Kingsley distanced herself from any feminist movement claims, arguing that women's suffrage was "a minor question; while there was a most vital section of men disenfranchised women could wait". Her consistent lack of identification with women's rights movements may be attributed to a number of causes, such as the attempt to ensure that her work would be received more favorably; in fact, some insist this might be a direct reference to her belief in the importance of securing rights for British traders in West Africa.

Over the next three years, she toured England, giving lectures about life in Africa to a wide array of audiences. She was the first woman to address the Liverpool and Manchester chambers of commerce.

Kingsley upset the Church of England when she criticised missionaries for attempting to convert the people of Africa and corrupt their religions. In this regard, she discussed many aspects of African life that were shocking to English people, including polygamy, which, she argued was practiced out of necessity. After living with the African people, Kingsley became directly aware how their societies functioned and how prohibiting customs such as polygamy would be detrimental to their way of life. She knew that the typical African wives had too many tasks to manage alone. Missionaries in Africa often required converted men to abandon all but one of their wives, leaving the other women and children without the support of a husband – thus creating immense social and economic problems. Kingsley's also criticised teetotal missionaries, suggesting that those who drank small quantities of alcohol had better survival rates.

Kingsley's beliefs about cultural and economic imperialism are complex and widely debated by scholars today. Though, on the one hand, she regarded African people and cultures as those who needed protection and preservation, she also believed in the necessity of British economic and technological influence and in indirect rule, insisting that there was some work in West Africa that had to be completed by white men. Yet in Studies in West Africa she writes: "Although a Darwinian to the core, I doubt if evolution in a neat and tidy perpendicular line, with Fetish at the bottom and Christianity at the top, represents the true state of affairs." Other, more acceptable, beliefs were variously perceived and used in Western European society – by traders, imperialists, women's rights activists and others – and, articulated as they were in great style, helped shape popular perception of "the African" and "his" land.

Writings 

Kingsley wrote two books about her experiences: Travels in West Africa (1897), which was an immediate best-seller, and West African Studies (1899), both of which gained her respect and prestige within the scholarly community. Some newspapers, however, such as the Times under pro-imperialist editor Flora Shaw, refused to publish reviews of her works. Though some have argued that such refusals were grounded in the anti-imperialist and pro-African arguments presented in Kingsley's works, this is unlikely to explain her sometimes unfavorable reception, because she was both a supporter of the activities of European traders in West Africa and the concept of indirect colonial rule.

The notable success of Travels in West Africa was due in no small part to the vigour and droll humour of writing, that, in the guise of a ripping yarn, never wavers from its true purpose – to complete the work her father had left undone. Between poles of manifest wit and latent analysis Kingsley constructs in images –  "… not an artist's picture, but a photograph, an overladen with detail, colourless version" – a discourse of poetic thought; a phenomenon oft-noted in the texts of Walter Benjamin. Of her method she said: "It is merely that I have the power of bringing out in my fellow-creatures, white or black, their virtues, in a way honourable to them and fortunate for me." Of her purpose she said: "[M]y motive for going to West Africa was study; this study was that of native ideas and practices in religion and law. My reason for taking up this study was a desire to complete a great book my father, George Kingsley, had left at his death unfinished." Of her father she said: "The work that he did seemed to promise a career of great brilliancy and distinction – a promise which, unfortunately, was never entirely fulfilled." In truth George Kingsley produced but a few scattered fragments, not a scrap of which found its way into the great book of Mary Kingsley. It is, rather, in the text of his daughter – a forerunner of Lévi-Strauss and his Tristes Tropiques – that the dream wish of the father is finally accomplished; and family honour sustained.

Death 

After the outbreak of the Second Boer War, Kingsley travelled to Cape Town on the SS Moor in March 1900, and volunteered as a nurse. She was stationed at Simon's Town hospital, where she treated Boer prisoners of war. After contributing her services to the ill for about two months, she developed symptoms of typhoid and died on 3 June 1900. An eyewitness reported: "She rallied for a short time but realised she was going. She asked to be left to die alone, saying she did not wish anyone to see her in her weakness. Animals she said, went away to die alone." In accordance with her wishes, she was buried at sea. "This was, I believe, the only favour and distinction that she ever asked for herself; and it was accorded with every circumstance and honour ... A party of West Yorkshires, with band before them, drew the coffin from the hospital on a gun carriage to the pier … Torpedo Boat No. 29 put to sea and, rounding Cape Point, committed her to the element in which she had chosen to be laid." "A touch of comedy, which would 'have amused' Kingsley herself, was added when the coffin refused to sink and had to be hauled back on board then thrown over again weighed down this time with an anchor."

Legacy 
Kingsley's tales and opinions of life in Africa helped draw attention to British imperial agendas abroad and the native customs of African people that were previously little discussed and misunderstood by people in Europe. The Fair Commerce Party formed soon after her death, pressuring for improved conditions for the natives of British colonies. Various reform associations were formed in her honour and helped facilitate governmental change. The Liverpool School of Tropical Medicine founded an honorary medal in her name. In Sierra Leone, the Mary Kingsley Auditorium at the Institute of African Studies, Fourah Bay College (University of Sierra Leone), was named after her.

Published works

 with an Introduction by Anthony Brandt

Gallery

See also 
 List of female adventurers

References

Citations

Sources

Further reading

  (A fictional account involving Mary Kingsley).
 
 
 
 
 
 
  A study of 18th Century Natural History - includes Charles Waterton, John Hanning Speke, Henry Seebohm and Mary Kingsley. Contains colour and black and white reproductions. 
 
 
  (The opening short story, Fish, is a fictional account of Kingsley's life)
 
  (An interesting look at women, race, and civilization, though not directly related to Mary Kingsley).

External links 

 Biography of Mary Henrietta Kingsley at the New World Encyclopedia.
 The Royal African Society has a short biography that includes a bibliography.
 
 
 
 
 Mary H. Kingsley, 1862-1900 at the Tom Perry Special Collections, Brigham Young University 
 
 Mary Henrietta Kingsley Papers (MS 1485). Manuscripts and Archives, Yale University Library.

1862 births
1900 deaths
19th-century English women writers
19th-century British writers
Burials at sea
Deaths from typhoid fever
English explorers
Nurses from London
English travel writers
Explorers of Africa
Female explorers
Female wartime nurses
People from Islington (district)
Women of the Victorian era
British women travel writers